George Hartford may refer to:

 George Huntington Hartford (1833–1917), American businessman
 George Ludlum Hartford (1864–1957), son and successor of George Huntington Hartford
 Huntington Hartford (George Huntington Hartford II, 1911–2008), grandson of George Huntington Hartford